A mechanical room, boiler room or plant room is a room or space in a building dedicated to the mechanical equipment and its associated electrical equipment, as opposed to rooms intended for human occupancy or storage. Unless a building is served by a centralized heating plant, the size of the mechanical room is usually proportional to the size of the building. A small building or home may have at most a utility room but in larger buildings, mechanical rooms can be of considerable size, often requiring multiple rooms throughout the building, or even occupying one or more complete floors (see: mechanical floor).

Equipment
Mechanical rooms typically house the following equipment:
Air handlers 
Boilers 
Chillers 
Heat exchangers
Water heaters and tanks
Water pumps (for domestic, heating/cooling, and firefighting water)
Main distribution piping and valves 
Sprinkler distribution piping and pumps
Back-up electrical generators 
Elevator machinery 
Back-up batteries 
Other HVAC (heating, ventilation and air-conditioning) equipment

Equipment in mechanical rooms is often operated and maintained by a stationary engineer or a maintenance technician. Modern buildings use control systems to manage HVAC cycles, lighting, communications, and life safety equipment. Often, the control system hardware is located in the mechanical room and monitored or accessed remotely.

Rooms with only electrical or electronic equipment are not considered mechanical rooms but are instead called electrical rooms.

See also
Noise pollution
Engine room
Electrical room
Steamfitter

References

External links

Heating, ventilation, and air conditioning
Rooms